is a 1993 album recorded by the trio Fredericks Goldman Jones. The album was released on 29 November 1993 and was not as successful as the singers' first studio album, but still spawned three singles which achieved some success in France : "" (#14), "" (#32) and "" (#33).

Album information
The collector edition of  has a box in aluminium, whose front cover is entirely carved, and some elements of which are painted red. The Alexandrov Ensemble participated in this recording, on the song "".

The album debuted at number one on 5 December 1993 and stayed there for seven consecutive weeks. It was ranked for 17 weeks in the top ten and for 42 weeks in the top 50. In 1995, it earned a Diamond disc for over 1,000,000 copies sold.

The album was briefly ranked at #41 in Switzerland.

Track listing

 "" — 2:18
 "" — 5:55
 "" — 4:54
 "" — 5:00
 "" — 4:39
 "" — 6:12
 "" — 5:44
 "" — 5:12
 "" — 4:19
 "" — 4:47
 "" — 5:07
 "" — 6:41

Personnel
 Tom Lord Aldge – mixing
  – arranger, keyboards, producer
  – assistant engineers
  – vocal
  – photo
  – engraving
  – guitar, vocal, art direction, musical direction, lyrics
 Michael Jones – guitar, vocal, guitar arrangements
  – bass
 Andy Scott – producer, engineer
  – guitar
 Chris Whitten – drums

Certifications

References

1993 albums
Jean-Jacques Goldman albums
Carole Fredericks albums
Albums produced by Erick Benzi